Krka, d. d., Novo mesto is an international generic pharmaceutical company with headquarters in Novo Mesto, Slovenia. As well as a number of companies and representative offices abroad, Krka also had production and distribution centers in Russia, Poland, Croatia, and Germany. Krka sells products to more than 70 countries.

In 2018, Krka Group’s total sales amounted to 1.332 billion euros. Over the previous five years, average annual sales growth had been at 2.9% rate. At the end of 2018, Krka Group had 11,390 employees.

Activities and products 
Krka’s business is founded on pharmaceutical and chemical activities. Prescription pharmaceuticals remain its main product group, with an 82.6% share of Krka Group’s total sales. They are followed in sales volume by non-prescription products (9.4%) and animal health products (5%). Its Terme Krka spas, hotels and tourism subsidiary contributed 2.8% of the parent group's sales volume.

Prescription pharmaceuticals 
The most important of Krka’s therapeutic groups include treatments for: cardiovascular diseases, alimentary tract diseases and metabolic disorders, and central nervous system diseases. They are followed by the medicines for the systemic treatment of infections, the medicines for the treatment of diseases of the blood and blood-forming organs, and the medicines for urinary tract diseases as well as the medicines for respiratory system diseases.

Its portfolio of treatments for cardiovascular disease include ACE inhibitors to treat high blood pressure (including enalapril and perindopril), sartans for those unable to tolerate ACE inhibitors (including losartan, valsartan and telmisartan), statins to reduce high cholesterol levels (including simvastatin, atorvastatin and rosuvastatin) and clopidogrel, a blood clot inhibitor.

The company makes proton pump inhibitors for the treatment of ulcers and reflux are the key group among the medicines for the treatment of alimentary tract diseases and metabolic disorders (lansoprazole, pantoprazole, esomeprazole).

In the group of medicines for the treatment of central nervous system diseases, Krka produces antidepressants (venlafaxine, sertraline), antipsychotics (olanzapine, quetiapine), as well as medicines for the treatment of Parkinson’s and Alzheimer’s diseases.

An important indication area also includes anti-microbial products (clarithromycin). Krka’s range of products includes analgesics, medicines for the treatment of diseases of the respiratory system, benign prostatic hyperplasia, and type-2 diabetes.

Non-prescription products 

Krka’s non-prescription products are aimed at preventing diseases and treating minor illnesses which do not require medical attention. They include products with an effect on the mouth cavity and the pharynx (Septolete), vitamin and mineral products (Pikovit and Duovit), medicines for cough and cold (Herbion syrups), a preparation promising improved memory and concentration (Bilobil), and an analgesic (Nalgesin S).

Animal health products 
Krka’s animal health products include general anti-infectives, antiparasitics and insecticides, products for the alimentary tract and metabolism, and antiseptics and disinfectants.

Health-resort and tourism services 
Krka’s line of business is supplemented by health-resort and tourist services of the subsidiary, the Terme Krka Group. It unites the business units of the spa complexes and hotels Terme Dolenjske Toplice, Terme Šmarješke Toplice, the coastal centre Talaso Strunjan, Hoteli Otočec with the only hotel in a castle in Slovenia, and the business Hotel Krka. Terme Krka’s basic line of business is the medical rehabilitation after cardiovascular and respiratory system diseases, as well as mobility problems.

Markets and business network 
Krka is an international company, selling more than 93% of its products in more than 70 countries worldwide. Subsidiaries and representative offices are present in the most important markets, while its production capacity is also located in Russia, Poland, Croatia and Germany.

Region East Europe is Krka Group’s largest sales region, representing 30.7% of total sales. It is followed by Region Central Europe with 24% of total sales and Region West Europe with 22.6% of total sales and Overseas Markets with 3.1% of total sales. In addition, Krka also sells its products in Africa, the Arabian Peninsula and the Far East. Krka achieved 12,7% of total sales in Region South-East Europe. Krka sells 6.9% of its products and services in Slovenia, being the leading pharmaceutical producer there.

Krka’s markets extend from Lisbon to Vladivostok. Krka has 25 subsidiaries and 20 representative offices abroad, which employ 52.6% of all workers.

Research and development 
In 2017 Krka acquired first marketing authorizations for 23 new products in 46 pharmaceutical dosage forms and strengths. In several countries, Krka also obtained 555 new marketing authorizations for various products.

History 
Krka’s pharmaceutical laboratory was founded in 1954; two years later it was transformed into a production plant. Krka registered its first pharmaceuticals on the domestic market and made inroads into foreign markets in the 1960s. During this time, Krka supplemented its offer with licensed products, obtaining its first FDA registration for antibiotics production.

In the early 1980s, Krka focused on the development of own generic products with added value.

In the 1980s, Krka started to develop its marketing network and strengthened its position on European markets.

By placing its shares on the Ljubljana Stock Exchange in 1997, Krka was transformed into a public limited company.

In 2003, Krka-Rus, a subsidiary of Krka, built a new production facility in Istra, northwest Moscow. The total costs amounted to $45 million.

In 2007, Krka acquired its first company abroad.

References

External links
 

Slovenian brands
Pharmaceutical companies of Slovenia
Pharmaceutical companies established in 1954
Economy of Novo Mesto
Multinational companies headquartered in Slovenia
1954 establishments in Slovenia